The Conference on Disarmament (CD) is a multilateral disarmament forum established by the international community to negotiate arms control and disarmament agreements based at the Palais des Nations in Geneva. The Conference meets annually in three separate sessions in Geneva.

History

The Conference was first established in 1979 as the Committee on Disarmament as the single multilateral disarmament negotiating forum of the international community. It was renamed the Conference on Disarmament in 1984.

The Conference succeeded three other disarmament-related bodies: the Ten Nation Committee on Disarmament (1960), the Eighteen Nation Committee on Disarmament (1962–1968) and the Conference of the Committee on Disarmament (1969–1978).

The Conference was created with a permanent agenda, also known as the "Decalogue", which includes the following topics:
 Nuclear weapons in all aspects
 Other weapons of mass destruction
 Conventional weapons
 Reduction of military budgets
 Reduction of armed forces
 Disarmament and development
 Disarmament and international security
 Collateral measures; confidence building measures; effective verification methods in relation to appropriate disarmament measures, acceptable to all parties
 Comprehensive programme of disarmament leading to general and complete disarmament under effective international control

Additionally, all decisions of the body must be agreed upon by consensus according to the rules and procedures of the conference.

Relationship to the United Nations
The Conference is formally independent from the United Nations. However, while it is not formally a UN organization, it is linked to it in various ways. First and foremost, the Director-General of the United Nations Office at Geneva serves as the Secretary-General of the Conference. Furthermore, while the Conference adopts its own rules of procedure and agenda, the United Nations General Assembly can pass resolutions recommending specific topics to the Conference. Finally, the Conference submits a report of its activities to the General Assembly yearly, or more frequently, as appropriate.

The Conference on Disarmament Secretariat and Conference Support Branch of the United Nations Office for Disarmament Affairs, based in Geneva, provides organizational and substantive servicing to the Conference on Disarmament, the single multilateral disarmament negotiating forum of the international community.

Work of the Conference
Initially, the Conference and its predecessors were successful in meeting their mandate. They were instrumental in drafting numerous arms control agreements: most importantly, the Treaty on the Non-Proliferation of Nuclear Weapons (1968), the Biological Weapons Convention (1972), the Chemical Weapons Convention (1993) and the Comprehensive Nuclear-Test-Ban Treaty (1996).

However, the work of the body was stalled for over a decade, as members were unable to agree on a work program after the passage of the Comprehensive Nuclear-Test-Ban Treaty. Difficulties included strained relations between key players, disagreement among members on the prioritization of issues, and attempts of some countries to link progress in one area to parallel progress in other areas.

Then, in 2009 a breakthrough was made by the body when it established several working groups to tackle various topics under the Conference's authority. These group focused on: negotiating a treaty banning the production of fissile material for nuclear weapons (FMCT), creating practical steps to reduce nuclear weapons, Prevention of an Arms Race in Outer Space (PAROS) and addressing negative security assurances.

Due to the general dysfunction of the Conference and its limited membership, negotiations for the 2017 Treaty on the Prohibition of Nuclear Weapons took place at the United Nations, and not at the Conference.

Membership 

The conference is currently composed of 65 formal members, representing all areas of the world, as well as all known nuclear-weapon states. Additionally, members are organized into a number of informal regional groups to facilitate their preparation for, and representation in the plenary meetings of the Conference.

Western European and Others Group (WEOG)

Group of 21 (G-21)

Eastern European Group (EEG)

Group of One

Non-member States 
Additionally, a number of states participate in meetings of the Conference as Non-member States:

See also 
 United Nations Office for Disarmament Affairs
 Conference for the Reduction and Limitation of Armaments

References

External links 

 United Nations' page of Conference on Disarmament
 Press releases of Conference on Disarmament
 Disarmament insight website

Arms control
International military conferences
United Nations organizations based in Geneva